PP-229 Vehari-I is a Constituency of Provincial Assembly of Punjab.

General elections 2013

 PP-232 Vehari Bye Election 2016 Result Information

General elections 2008

 PP 232 Vehari General Election 2008 Result Information

See also
 PP-228 Lodhran-V
 PP-230 Vehari-II

References

External links
 Election commission Pakistan's official website
 Awazoday.com check result
 Official Website of Government of Punjab

Provincial constituencies of Punjab, Pakistan